Kashmiri Shaikh or Kashmiri Sheikh is a Muslim community, who mainly live in the Kashmir region of India and those who migrated to what is now Pakistani Punjab. The Kashmiri Shaikhs are considered to be a clan of Kashmiri origin also found predominantly in Pakistani Punjab and also in other parts of India.

After the advent of Islam into Afghanistan and India, a significant number of Hindu Brahmins in Kashmir converted to Islam and adopted the title of Shaikh and later migrated to other regions of the country. In Punjab, they are known as Kashmiri Shaikhs. The Kashmiri Shaikhs are predominantly urban.

Notable people
 
 
 Sheikh Abdullah, Kashmiri politician
 Ghulam Ahmad, Pakistani forestry official and businessman
 Sheikh Rasheed Ahmad, Pakistani politician
Nadeem Anjum, DG ISI, Mohra Sheikhan, Pakistan.
Allama Muhammad Iqbal, A Kashmiri Sheikh belonging originally to the Sapru Clan of Brahmins.

See also
Kashmiri Muslims
Kashmiri Hindus

References

Kashmiri tribes
Social groups of India
Social groups of Jammu and Kashmir
Indian surnames
Kashmiri-language surnames